Al Ain FC is a professional football club, based in Al Ain, Abu Dhabi, United Arab Emirates. It is one of many sport sections of the multi-sports club Al Ain Sports and Cultural Club Al Ain SCC for short. Founded in 1968 by players from Al Ain, members of a Bahraini group of exchange students and the Sudanese community working in the United Arab Emirates.

Al Ain made a successful debut by beating a team made up of British soldiers and went on to play friendly matches against other Abu Dhabi clubs. In 1971, the team played their first match against international opposition when they were defeated 7–0 by the Egyptian club Ismaily in a friendly match for the war effort. Has amassed various records since its founding, quickly gained popularity and recognition throughout the country, being the team with the most trophies 35 in total.

Honours
35 official Championships.

Doubles and trebles (6–1) 

 Doubles

 League and President's Cup doubles (1) (shared record):

 2017–18

 League and League Cup (1):

 2021–22

 President's Cup and GCC Champions League (1):

 2000–01

 President's Cup and Federation Cup (2):

 2004–05, 2005–06

 President's Cup and League Cup (1):

 2008–09

 Treble

 League, Super Cup and Champions League (1) (record):

 2002–03

Players records

Most appearances

All competitions 
As of match played 22 May 2022
The below list is since the Pro League era starting in 2008–09.

Notes

Top goalscorers

All competitions 
As of 22 August 2022.
Bold indicates player is still active at club level.

Note: this includes goals scored in all competitions.

UAE Pro League
Statistics correct as of match played on 12 March 2023

AFC Champions League
Since 2002–03 AFC Champions League, includes goals scored in qualifying play-offStatistics correct as of match played against Al Nassr on 24 September 2020

FIFA Club World Cup
Statistics correct as of match played against Real Madrid on 22 December 2018

Asian Cup Winners' Cup

GCC Champions League

Asian Club Championship

Players' individual honours and awards while playing with Al Ain

 Al Ain players that have been the top scorer of UAE Pro League:
 Mohieddine Habita (1977–78, 20 goals)
 Ahmed Abdullah (1981–82, 13 goals); (1983–84, 20 goals)
 Saif Sultan (1992–93, 21 goals)
 José Sand (2009–10, 24 goals)
 Asamoah Gyan (2011–12, 21); (2012–13, 31); (2013–14, 29)
 Marcus Berg (2017–18, 25 goals)
 Kodjo Fo-Doh Laba (2019–20, 19 goals); (2021–22, 26)
 Al Ain players that have been the top scorer of UAE President's Cup:
 Ahmed Abdullah (1978–79, 5 goals) 
 Ali Al-Wehaibi (2005–06, 3 goals)
 Nenad Jestrović (2006–07, 4 goals)
 André Dias (2008–09, 9 goals) 
 Asamoah Gyan (2013–14, 6 goals); (2014–15, 4 goals)
 Dyanfres Douglas (2015–16, 5 goals)
 Al Ain players that have won the GCC Golden Boot:
 Ahmed Abdullah (1982–83, 20 goals in 18 games)
 Saif Sultan (1992–93, 21 goals in 22 games)
 José Sand (2009–10, 24 goals in 22 games)
 Asamoah Gyan (2011–12, 22 goals in 22 games); (2012–13, 31 goals in 26 games); (2013–14, 29 goals in 26 games)
 Al Ain players that have won the Asian Footballer of the Year:
 Omar Abdulrahman (1): 2016
 Al Ain players that have won the Best player award at AFC Champions League:
 Seydou Traoré (1): 1999
 Omar Abdulrahman (1): 2016
 Al Ain players that have been the top scorer of AFC Champions League:
 Asamoah Gyan (2014, 12 goals in 12 games)
 Al Ain players that were included in the AFC Champions League Team of the Season:
 Omar Abdulrahman (3),  Lee Myung-joo (2),  Asamoah Gyan (1),  Ismail Ahmed (1),  Caio Lucas (1),  Danilo Asprilla (1)
 Al Ain players that have won Player of the week awards at AFC Champions League:
 Omar Abdulrahman (1),  Khalid Eisa (1)
 Al Ain players that have won man of the match at FIFA Club World Cup:
 Khalid Eisa (2),  Hussein El Shahat (1)
 Al Ain players that have won Adidas Silver Ball at FIFA Club World Cup:
 Caio Lucas (1): (2018)

See also
 List of Al Ain FC seasons
 Al Ain FC in international football

References

External links
 

Records And Statistics
Al Ain
Records